Niels Nielsen (born 26 January 1939) is a Danish rower. He competed in the men's coxed four event at the 1964 Summer Olympics.

References

1939 births
Living people
Danish male rowers
Olympic rowers of Denmark
Rowers at the 1964 Summer Olympics
Rowers from Copenhagen